Dijon is a city in eastern France.  

Dijon may also refer to:

People
 Dijon Carruthers, bassist for Megadeath
 Dijon McFarlane or DJ Mustard (born 1990), American record producer and DJ
 Dijon Kizzee (died 2020), cyclist who died in an incident with police
 Dijon Prioleau (born 1992), American gospel singer
 Dijon Shariff (born 1991), American rapper
 Dijon Thompson (born 1983), American basketball player
 Lil Dijon, Australian hiphop artist
 Rocky Dijon (1935–1993), Ghanaian musician
 Dijon Duenas (born 1992), American musician who performs as Dijon

Places
 Dijon Métropole. the Dijon metropolitan area
 Arrondissement of Dijon, arrondissement of France
 Canton of Dijon-1, Côte-d'Or, France
 Canton of Dijon-2, Côte-d'Or, France
 Canton of Dijon-3, Côte-d'Or, France
 Canton of Dijon-4, Côte-d'Or, France
 Canton of Dijon-5, Côte-d'Or, France
 Canton of Dijon-6, Côte-d'Or, France
 Canton of Dijon-7, Côte-d'Or, France; see Arrondissement of Dijon
 Canton of Dijon-8, Côte-d'Or, France; see Arrondissement of Dijon

Facilities and structures
 Dijon Air Base (IATA airport code: DIJ, ICAO airport code: LFSD; aka Aéroport Dijon-Bourgogne), formerly joint military-civilian airfield now civilian, for the city of Dijon
 Dijon-Prenois (aka "Dijon"), a racetrack in Prenois near Dijon
 Dijon Cathedral, a Roman Catholic cathedral in the city of Dijon
 Dijon-Ville station, a rail station in the city of Dijon
 Dijon–Vallorbe railway, in France
 University of Dijon, in the city of Dijon
 Academy of Dijon

Sports
 Dijon FCO, men's football club based in the city of Dijon
 Dijon FCO (women), women's soccer club based in the city of Dijon
 JDA Dijon Basket, basketball club based in the city of Dijon

Other
 
 Battle of Dijon (500), see 500s (decade)
 Siege of Dijon (1513)
 Battle of Dijon (1870), see Timeline of Dijon
 Parlement de Dijon, the defunct provincial parliament for the province of Burgundy
 Dijon (DuckTales), character from the DuckTales animated television series
 Dijon mustard, French mustard
 Dijon sauce

See also

 Dijon-Porte-Neuve station, a rail station in the city of Dijon
 Church of Notre-Dame of Dijon, Dijon, France
 
 Dijonnaise
 Honey Dijon (disambiguation)